The Lisec Ambush was an attack carried out by the NLA on a Macedonian police patrol on May 22, 2001, it was one of the most intense infantry engagement in the war.

Prelude

Weeks before the NLA ambushed a police patrol near Vejce in the Tetovo region killing 8, and a week before in the same region in Lisec a Macedonian patrol was ambushed leaving 1 injured, the attackers missed the vehicles and failed to stop the patrol

Aftermath

Fighting in the region of Lisec continued throughout the war and on June 1, 8 NLA rebels were reported killed.

See also

Vejce Ambush

References

2001 insurgency in Macedonia